Ray Sarcevic (born 14 February 1964) is a former Australian rules footballer who played for Geelong in the Victorian Football League (VFL) during the 1980s.

Sarcevic, recruited from North Geelong, made just four VFL appearances, three of them in 1984 and the other in 1985. He later played at Southport in the AFL Queensland competition and won a Joe Grant Medal for his performance in the 1989 Grand Final. In the same year he kicked a club record 20 goals in a game against Kedron. Sarcevic was a Queensland representative at the 1988 Adelaide Bicentennial Carnival.

References

Holmesby, Russell and Main, Jim (2007). The Encyclopedia of AFL Footballers. 7th ed. Melbourne: Bas Publishing.

1964 births
Living people
Geelong Football Club players
Southport Australian Football Club players
Australian rules footballers from Victoria (Australia)
North Geelong Football Club players